was born in Osaka, Japan. He was a Japanese artist and considered a pioneer of modern jewelry in Japan. He served as a member of the Japan Craft Design Association, the Japan Jewellery Designers Association, and the Mitglied von der Gesellschaft für Goldschmiedekunst.

Awards and prizes
1952–1957　Twice awarded prizes from the Living Industrial Arts Institute, Tokyo, Japan 　
1969　Gold Prize at 3rd Craft Center Japan
1970　Prize at the Japan New Craft Exhibition, Tokyo 　
1990　Created a present for Empress Kōjun to bestow on the Empress Michiko on her enthronement
1991　41st Craft Award in Excellence awarded by the Japanese Government Ministry of Education, Culture, Sports, Science and Technology
1994 　First non-European to be awarded 'the Ring of Goldsmiths' from Gellschaft fur Goldschmiedekunst
1995 　Awarded ìContribution to Design Promotion' by the Japanese Government Ministry of International Trade and Industry
1996　Awarded 'Bayerischer Staatspreis' by the Bayern Government Ministry, Germany
1997　Awarded 'Kunii Kitaro Prize' by Japan Industrial Art Foundation.

Solo exhibition
1978　Galerie am Graben, Wien, Austria　　　
1990　Electrum Gallery, London
1993　Professor Yasuki Hiramatsu Retirement Exhibition, Tokyo University of the Arts
1994　STUDIO TON BERENDS, Den Haag, Netherlands
1995 LUISE SMIT, Amsterdam, Netherlands
1996　Galerij Sofie Lachaert, Gent, Belgium
1997　Magari, Barcelona, Spain; Galerij Sofie Lachaert, Antwerpen, Belgium
2006　Gallery HANAIRO, Anraku-ji (temple), Kyoto
2008　Crafts Gallery, The National Museum of Modern Art, Tokyo

References 

Japanese jewellery designers
1926 births
2012 deaths